The third season of MTV's reality dating series Are You the One? premiered on September 24, 2015.

Cast

Progress 

Notes

 Unconfirmed Perfect Match

Due to the blackout in Episode 2, the whole cast lost $250,000, lowering the total money at the end to $750,000, instead of $1,000,000.

In Episode 9, Mike was removed from the competition due to an altercation that turned violent with Amanda. The girls were still able to choose Mike that week and Kiki chose him during her turn (as he was the only available guy that has not already been confirmed as not a match for Kiki in the Truth Booth). In the end, it turned out that Mike and Kiki were perfect matches.

Truth Booths

Episodes

After filming 
Mike Crescenzo was later a cast member of the thirty-second season of The Real World.

Devin Walker-Molaghan & Rashida Beach competed on Are You The One?: Second Chances.

In 2017, Cheyenne Floyd gave birth to her and Real World: Ex-Plosion cast member Cory Wharton's daughter, Ryder. A year later, Floyd joined the cast of Teen Mom OG and also appeared on How Far Is Tattoo Far? On May 27, 2021, Floyd gave birth to son Ace Terrell with, now husband, Zach Davis.

In 2020, Amanda Garcia welcomed first son Avonni with then-boyfriend Ray Reinhardt. 

On December 17, 2021, Connor Smith was arrested for an alleged sexual assault of a 16-year-old girl in July 2021. He was charged with rape, sexual battery, and two counts of criminal confinement.

The Challenge 

Challenge in bold indicates that the contestant was a finalist on The Challenge.

References

Are You the One?
2015 American television seasons